Takaroa Airport  is an airport on Takaroa in the Tuamotu in French Polynesia.

Airlines and destinations

Passenger

References

External links
 Atoll list (in French)
 Classification of the French Polynesian atolls by Salvat (1985)

Airports in French Polynesia
Atolls of the Tuamotus